Krishnakoemarie "Krishna" Mathoera (born 23 May 1963) is a Surinamese senior policewoman who became a politician in 2015. She was a member of the National Assembly in Suriname for the Progressive Reform Party (VHP). On 16 July 2020, Mathoera was appointed as Minister of Defense.

Biography
She was born in 1963. She began her public service in about 1980 when she joined the Suriname police force and served for 34 years. During that time in she was Suriname's representative with the Inter-American Drug Abuse Control Commission from 2010 for five years. When she left in 2015 she decided to run for parliament.

She is a member of the National Assembly in Suriname for the Progressive Reform Party (VHP).

She believes in law and order and that more of the national budget should be spent on law enforcement. Her own estimate is that the proceeds from illegal drugs is contributing about a billion dollars into the Suriname economy as it estimated that only about 20% of smuggled drugs are intercepted by the police.

She hoped to restore the country's economics noting that between 2010 and 2020 the value of 2000 Suriname dollars in US dollars had fallen from $714 to $142 - lowering the buying power of every citizen. The reduced exchange rate effects the large national debt. The current debt was $5,480.34, but with the reduced exchange rate this translated into a debt, per capita, of SRD 78,120.

In 2011, Mathoera graduated with a master's degree in public administration at the FHR Lim A Po Institute for Social Studies in Paramaribo.

2020 Surinamese general election
She was pleased to see the turnout for the 2020 Surinamese general election but although she was there at 6:30 a.m. it was taking hours to process the voters. She was popularly re-elected in the 2020 election when she was the VHP party leader in Paramaribo, and is one of seven elected VHP members of Paramaribo. On 16 July 2020, she became the Minister of Defense in the cabinet of Santokhi.

References

1963 births
Living people
Female defence ministers
Defense ministers of Suriname
Members of the National Assembly (Suriname)
People from Wanica District
Surinamese police officers
Surinamese politicians
Women government ministers of Suriname
Women police officers
Surinamese politicians of Indian descent